North Leicestershire, formally the "Northern Division of Leicestershire", was a county constituency represented in the House of Commons of the Parliament of the United Kingdom. It elected two Members of Parliament (MPs) by the bloc vote system of election.

Boundaries
1832–1885: The Hundreds of West Goscote, East Goscote and Framland, and the two detached portions of the Hundred of Gartree situated on the east of the Hundred of East Goscote (the parishes of Baggrave, Burrough, Knossington, Marefield, Pickwell-cum-Leesthorpe, Ouston, and Newbold-Saucey).

History
The constituency was created by the Reform Act 1832 for the 1832 general election, when the two-seat Leicestershire constituency was replaced by the Northern and Southern divisions, each of which elected two MPs.

Both divisions were abolished by the Redistribution of Seats Act 1885 for the 1885 general election, when they were replaced by four new single-seat constituencies: Bosworth, Harborough, Loughborough and Melton.

Members of Parliament

Election results

Elections in the 1830s

 

 

Manners' death caused a by-election.

Elections in the 1840s

Elections in the 1850s

 

Manners succeeded to the peerage, becoming 6th Duke of Rutland and causing a by-election.

 
 

Manners was appointed First Commissioner of Works and Public Buildings, requiring a by-election.

Elections in the 1860s

 
 

Manners was appointed First Commissioner of Works and Public Buildings, requiring a by-election.

Elections in the 1870s

 
 

Manners was appointed Postmaster General of the United Kingdom, requiring a by-election.

Elections in the 1880s

 

Burnaby's death caused a by-election.

Manners was appointed Postmaster General of the United Kingdom, requiring a by-election.

References 

F W S Craig, British Parliamentary Election Results 1832–1885 (2nd edition, Aldershot: Parliamentary Research Services, 1989)

Parliamentary constituencies in Leicestershire (historic)
Constituencies of the Parliament of the United Kingdom established in 1832
Constituencies of the Parliament of the United Kingdom disestablished in 1885